The Women's London Cup (previously the Pemberton Greenish Cup) is an English cricket competition played as a one-off Twenty20 match between Middlesex and Surrey each year since 2015. It was conceived by Surrey's Director of Women's Cricket Ebony Rainford-Brent. Middlesex won the first five editions, before Surrey won at the sixth time of asking in 2020. Middlesex won back the title in 2021, before Surrey claimed their second title in 2022, winning by nine wickets at The Oval.

Results

References

Women's cricket competitions in England
English domestic cricket competitions
Cricket in London
Cricket in Middlesex
Cricket in Surrey
2015 establishments in England
Women's sport in London